Throughout the stories published in Marvel Comics since his first appearance in Journey into Mystery  #83 (Aug. 1962), the Thor character has accumulated a number of recognizable supporting characters. Like Thor, many of these characters are based on mythological figures, however a number of original characters have appeared as well. Thor has also formed strong bonds or close working relationships with other superheroes since becoming a founding member of The Avengers in 1963. In addition, Thor has an extensive rogues gallery.

Family
Like Thor most of his family members are based on figures from Norse Mythology and as in those myths they fill major roles throughout the publication. Thor's relationship with his family has been described as "shakespearean".

Angela; the daughter of Odin and Frigga, who as an infant was presumably killed by Angels of the Tenth Realm known as Heven, during their attack on Asgard.
Balder; god of light based on the deity Baldr, is one of Thor's closest friends since childhood. It is revealed that he is actually the son of Odin and Frigga thus making him Thor's half-brother. Odin kept Balder's true identity hidden as he feared a prophecy that stated Balder's death would one day trigger Ragnarök, for this spells were cast making him near-indestructible in Asgard. Balder assumes the throne of Asgard when Thor is exiled.
Bestla; a Jötunn based on Bestla, is married to Borr, mother of Odin and grandmother of Thor.
Bor; Odin's father based on the deity Borr, was turned into snow by a powerful sorcerer (revealed to be Loki) during a war with the frost giants. Loki later revived Borr in New York City, confused and enraged Borr attacked Thor. Thor subsequently killed him, not knowing it was his grandfather and as a result is banished from Asgard.
Buri; Odin's grandfather based on the deity Búri, was the first of the gods. Buri came into being when he was licked out of the ice that was Ymir's body by Auðumbla.
Cul; god of fear, he's the brother of Odin and uncle of Thor. He is supervillain who had clashed with various Asgardians and other Heroes.
Frigga; goddess of marriage based on the deity Frigg, is Odin's wife, step mother of Thor and foster mother to Loki. Frigga is seen as mother figure to most Asgardians even consoling a heartbroken Sif. It is revealed later that she is also mother to Balder whom she once used her powers to make almost completely invulnerable (the notable exception being mistletoe). Frigga was also instrumental in the rearing and training of the Young Gods.
Gaea; goddess of the Earth based on the deity Gaia from Greek mythology, is Thor's biological mother. Gaea as Jord (Jörð) mated with Odin, who wanted a son who would be strong on Earth (not just in Asgard) and gave birth to Thor. Odin kept the true identity of his mother hidden from Thor. However this was later revealed to Thor when Gaea pleads with Arishem the Judge to spare his life and heals his wounds from the preceding battle.
Hermod; god of speed based on the deity Hermóðr, is Thor's half brother by Odin and Frigga. Hermod is employed as Odin's messenger due to his great speed. His greatest mission was when he traveled to Hel in order to ask the goddess Hela for information on how to revive Balder the Brave after Loki tricked Hoder into shooting Balder with an arrow tipped with mistletoe.
Hoder; god of winter based on the deity Höðr, is Thor's blind cousin, son of his uncle Vili. Loki tricks Holder into shooting Balder with an arrow tipped with mistletoe when testing Balder's invulnerability.
Loki; god of mischief based on the deity Loki, is Thor's principal antagonist. Loki was orphaned when Odin slew his father Laufey, a frost giant in battle. Odin taking pity on Loki, adopts him as his own son. It is later revealed that Loki himself was the one that set these events into motion. Loki eventually brings ragnarök to Asgard when he steals the forge that created Mjolnir and revives the demon Surtur, who forges new uru hammers for Loki and his allies. After Thor recreates Asgard in Oklahoma, Loki manipulates Thor into restoring him as well.
Mimir; based on Mímir, is Odin's uncle and guardian of the well of wisdom. Mimir was beheaded during the Æsir–Vanir War and his living head was brought to Odin, who turned it into fire. In this state Mimir was given the power of prophecy and Odin made him his advisor. Odin sacrificed his right eye to Mimir's well for the wisdom to forestall ragnarök. Later Thor sacrifices both his eyes for insight on how to end the ragnarök cycle.
Odin; the all-father, ruler of Asgard based on the deity Odin, is Thor's father. Odin with his brothers Vili and Ve slew the frost giant Ymir, who he was descended from, and with his body created the heavens and earth. Odin and his brothers then ventured to Múspellsheimr and fought Surtur. Overwhelmed Vili and Ve sacrificed themselves to allow Odin to escape. Their deaths also granted Odin the "Odinforce". Odin later fights Surtur on Earth, where both are killed. The Odinforce then passes to Thor who becomes lord of Asgard. After Asgard and all its inhabitants seemingly perish during ragnarök, Thor is reawaken from the void of nonexistence and restores all other the Asgardians with the exception of Odin. Thor eventually finds Odin engaged in eternal battle against Surtur in the void, where he chooses to remain.
Tyr; god of war based on the deity Týr, son of Odin is Thor's older brother. Tyr a veteran who lost his left hand while binding the Fenris wolf was the defender of Asgard before the time of Thor. Tyr becomes resentful when Thor replaces him. After Sif rejects Tyr's advances, he jealously travels to Earth to attack Thor and is defeated. Later Tyr rebels against Odin due to his favoritism of Thor, he allies with Loki and unleashes the Midgard Serpent on Earth but is undone when Loki double crosses him. Since that time Tyr has reconciled and fought valiantly for Asgard during ragnarök.
Vidar; god of strength based on the deity Víðarr, is Odin's son by the jötunn, Grid. Being a half-giant Vidar was not accepted and lived outside the city walls of Asgard as a farmer. When Vidar's wife Solveig was murdered by three giants, Odin dispatched Vidar's half-brother Thor and his cousin Hoder to help him find the murderers. During ragnarök Thor finds Vidar's body apparently slain by trolls while defending his lands, Thor has Vidar's fields set ablaze to serve as a massive funeral pyre to honor his passing.
Vili and Ve are Odin's brothers, sons of Borr and Bestla. Vili also has a son, Hoder. They sacrificed themselves early in Asgard's history to allow Odin to survive and realize his dreams for Asgard.

Genealogy

Other superheroes
Thor regularly interacts with other Marvel superheroes as a member of the Avengers. A few, however, have marked a presence in the core Thor titles:

Beta Ray Bill; An alien from the Korbonite race, the warrior Bill proved worthy to lift Mjolnir. He beat Thor in a battle for the right to wield the hammer, but when he decided to let the thunder god keep it after all, he was awarded the mystical hammer Stormbreaker by Odin as a reward. Since receiving Stormbreaker, Bill has been a loyal ally of Thor and the Asgardians, especially Sif whom he has developed a particularly close relationship. Bill even served as a member of the briefly lived Thor Corps. During Ragnarök Bill came to the aid of Asgard and when Thor left to find a means to end the cycle once and for all, he left Bill in charge of the Asgardian forces.
Captain America; the honorary co-founder of the Avengers has developed a close bond with Thor over the years as a brother in arms. This bond was further strengthened when Cap proved worthy to lift Mjolnir. When Loki's forces overran Asgard during Ragnarök, Thor sought the aid of Captain America and Iron Man who were able to help the Asgardians regroup. Later Thor returns after the events of Ragnarök only to discover that Captain America had been assassinated and visits his grave. There he encounters Cap's spirit which is not able rest due to the mass media politicizing his death. Thor honors him by flying into space and disrupting every satellite signal for sixty seconds thus granting him a moment of peace.
Hercules; the son of Zeus based on the hero Heracles from Greek mythology, is both the longtime friend and rival of Thor. Their friendly rivalry begins after Thor (without his powers) is beaten by Hercules but then rescues him from Hades. The two brawl again in limited series Thor: Blood Oath and later in The Incredible Hercules with Hercules disguised as Thor and Thor disguised as Hercules. Hercules joins the Avengers himself after assisting them in reserve capacity for some time.
 Hulk; a co-founder of the Avengers shares one of the most significant rivalries in the Marvel Universe with Thor. The rivalry begins after the Hulk leaves the Avengers and allies with Namor as the latter bids to rule over humanity. In the midst of the ensuing battle between the Avengers and the Hulk and Namor, Odin grants Thor's request to be able to retain his powers without his hammer for five minutes so that he might test his strength against the Hulk. The two fight to a stalemate before the tunnel they are fighting in collapses and are forced to separate. The two battle again in The Incredible Hulk #255 (1968), The Defenders #10 (1973), The Mighty Thor #385 (1987), Heroes Reborn #2 (1996), The Avengers #5 (1997), The Incredible Hulk Annual 2001 and Onslaught Reborn #2 (2006). Despite this Thor respects the Hulk and they eventually become friends after Thor aids Hulk in defeating the Red Hulk. The rivalry comes to a head during the events of Fear Itself, in which Thor fights Hulk, who has been turned into Nul: Breaker of Worlds. During their battle Thor states that he has always thought of Hulk as "a pain in the ass." Once the battle nears a conclusion Thor says to Hulk "I cannot beat you, you know. And I never could," to bait the Hulk into moving in for the takedown.  Thor then uses Mjolnir to knock Hulk into outerspace.
Iron Man; a co-founder of the Avengers like Captain America has developed a friendship with Thor. Iron Man with Captain America even aided Asgard during Ragnarök. However this friendship was strained when Thor returns and learns that Iron Man and others used his DNA to build a clone to fight in the Civil War. Despite this Thor comes to Iron Man's aid when he is left in a vegetative state after Iron Man is savagely beaten by Norman Osborn.
Silver Surfer; a former herald of Galactus became an ally of Thor after Loki attempted to use the Surfer as a tool to defeat his brother. Convinced Thor is evil by Loki, the Surfer is transported to Asgard and challenges Thor to a fight. However the Surfer realizes that he has been deceived when he sees Thor's honor in battle. Later the Surfer along with Adam Warlock help cure Thor of his "warrior's madness" when he becomes enraged by a valkyrie. Silver Surfer and Thor would also team up to defeat the villain Millennius after he creates a rift between Earth and Asgard in an attempt to escape his dimensional prison.
Thor Girl; an alien destined to become the Designate, a being who will help evolve sentient beings to the next level of existence becomes an ally and admirer of Thor after he helps defeat Thanos who destroyed her home world. She then comes to Earth, transforms herself into an Asgardian and takes the name Thor Girl. Thor Girl nearly loses all of her powers in battle against Surtur that also results in Odin's death. Thor Girl also played an important role in ending an alternate future where Thor rules Asgard and Earth with an iron fist known as 'The Reigning'.
Thunderstrike; an architect by the name of Eric Masterson is initially bonded with Thor after the Thunder God is punished for apparently killing Loki. Masterson carries the mantle of Thor for several years, continuing Thor's dual roles as a member of the Avengers and protector of Midgard. Thor is eventually freed, and in gratitude for his services, Odin provides Masterson with an enchanted mace, which he uses under the alias of Thunderstrike. Masterson also served on the Thor Corps with Beta Ray Bill and a future incarnation of Thor named Dargo Ktor. Later Thunderstrike succumbs to the curse of the Bloodaxe, which he used to defeat Seth but dies after finally being able to rid himself of the curse.
Storm; a member of the X-Men, when she along with the New Mutants were captured by Loki, he gave her a replica of Mjolnir called Stormcaster in order to discredit Thor, however, this backfired.

Villains

Thor has an extensive rogue's gallery, some of his most memorable villains include; Loki, the Enchantress, Malekith, Hela, Mangog, Surtur, and the Wrecking Crew.

Love interests
Thor has had several notable romances throughout his long history:

Sif, a warrior based on the deity Sif, is one of Thor's main love interests. However, Thor's draw to Earth has been a constant distraction. Sif did for a time try to live a mortal life on Earth, but found it to be mundane and returned to Asgard. Furthermore, their relationship has suffered from numerous interruptions by other women, particularly Jane Foster, the Enchantress, and Lorelei. Sif and Thor, however, have always found a way to rekindle their romance. After the events of Ragnarok, Thor was able to restore every Asgardian with the exception of Sif, whose spirit was trapped inside the body of a dying elderly woman. Thor eventually was able to restore Sif as well, just before the elderly woman died.
Jane Foster, a nurse, was involved in a love triangle with Thor and Dr. Donald Blake, not knowing they were one. Thor eventually reveals the truth to Jane and takes her to Asgard where she is granted immortality and status as a goddess. Disapproving, Odin strips Jane of her newly acquired powers, returns her to Earth without memories of Asgard, where she marries Dr. Keith Kinkaid and has a child. Much later, Dr. Donald Blake returns to Earth after emerging from the void of nonexistence and encounters Jane, who has since divorced Dr. Kinkaid. After a rocky exchange, the two agree to go on a date.
The Enchantress is one of Thor's most notable antagonists and lovers. Since her introduction, Amora, The Enchantress, has often tried to use her magic to seduce Thor and eliminate her competition for Thor's affections. However, Thor did form a willing romance with Amora during a vulnerable state when Odin abandoned him without his powers on Earth. This relationship reached its pinnacle when Thor assumed the throne of Asgard and took the Enchantress as his bride. Amora helped Thor create a dark future in which they ruled Asgard and Earth with an iron fist and even had a child, Magni. However, this was all undone when Thor traveled back in time to prevent this future from occurring.
Shawna Lynde, a fellow doctor of Donald Blake's. Both had supposedly graduated from medical school together. Shawna had an open crush on Blake, but was unaware of his connection as Thor. She too was briefly caught in a love triangle between herself Blake and Sif, however she was unaware of Sif's identity and thought that she was Blake's cousin 'Sybil'. When Donald Blake ceased to exist, she became concerned, but had her memory wiped by Fandral. He reveals that even though she won't remember Blake in her waking life, she would still feel his presence in her dreams.
Lorelei, like her sister Amora, the Enchantress, has also used magic to gain the affections of Thor. Loki persuaded Lorelei into giving Thor an elixir that would cause him to fall in love with her. Loki hoped Lorelei could then use her influence over Thor to gain his support for Loki's bid for the throne of Asgard. However, the Enchantress jealously cast a spell of her own, which caused Lorelei to fall in love with Loki. Heimdall in turn used this to expose Thor to their plot.
Brunnhilde the valkyrie attempted (to no avail) to save the life of Thor, who was incarnated as Sigmund against Odin's wishes. Brunnhilde was, however, able to keep Sigmund's pregnant wife, Sieglinde, from harm. As punishment, Odin removed Brunnhilde's powers and cast her into a deep sleep. Brunnhilde is eventually awakened by Thor, who reincarnated as Siegfried, the son of Sigmund and Sieglinde. Brunnhilde and Siegfried become lovers, but Siegfried, under the influence of magic, betrays her. When Siegfried is killed, Brunnhilde, who is still in love with him, jumps into his blazing funeral pyre. Odin, so moved by these events, fully restores both Brunnhilde and Thor but wipes their memories.
She-Hulk, during the battle against the Dark Celestials, Jennifer Walters became romantically involved with Thor, but was concerned that Thor was only interested in her Hulk persona, until they had a heart-to-heart moment.

Other supporting characters
Dr. Donald Blake; a handicapped surgeon, is Thor's most significant mortal host. Blake discovered that he had merged with Thor when he found Mjolnir in the form of a stick while vacationing in Norway. Blake maintained these dual roles for some time until Odin removed Thor from Blake which unknowingly sent Blake into the void of nonexistence. However, when the Asgardians seemingly perished during Ragnarok, Blake was suddenly transported back to Earth. Blake then finds Mjolnir and returns to the void to awaken Thor so that they may remerge together.
Frey; based on the deity Freyr, helped construct Valhalla. After Valhalla was damaged in an attack Odin bribed two giants to restore it by promising to give them Idunn. Loki promised to Odin that he would keep Idunn safe and the debt would never be paid but Loki handed Idunn over to the giants anyway. Frey and Thor fought the two giants but were forced to stand down when Odin revealed his promise to the giants. However the giants did agree to relinquish Idunn in exchange for the ring of Nibelung.
Freya; goddess of fertility based on the deity Freyja, is the sister of Frey. When Thor's hammer, Mjolnir was stolen by the giant, Thyrm, he offered its return in exchange for the hand of Freya in marriage. However Freya refused to be bartered away and Thor was forced to dress in Freya's clothes in order to trick the giant into returning his hammer.
Heimdall; the brother of Sif based on the deity Heimdall, is the omniscient sentry of Asgard that stands guard on the Bifröst bridge. After ragnarok, Heimdall was the first Asgardian to be restored by Thor, so that he may aid in locating the others.
Hugin and Munin; based on the ravens of the same names from Norse mythology. Munin and Hugin are brothers and the ravens of Odin. He sends them out into the Nine Realms each day to learn what was transpiring. They are the ones that tell Odin about the coming of Ragnarök.
Idunn; based on the deity Iðunn, is the keeper of the golden apples. Idunn was offered as payment to two giants for restoring the walls of Valhalla but the giants settled for the ring of Nibelung. Idunn was captured again by Loki and Tyr who wanted to feed her golden apples to the Midgard Serpant as part of their plan to lay siege to Asgard. She was later rescued by Balder and the Warriors Three while her apples were retrieved by Thor.
Kelda; an Asgardian first appearing in the third volume of Thor. Kelda and her human lover Bill uncover Loki's plot with Doctor Doom in Latveria.
Magni; born during the alternate future known as The Regining is the son of Thor and the Enchantress. Magni grew up unaware of the extent of his parents tryanny on Earth until he witnessed the Warriors Three brutally put down a human uprising and found the home of his mortal girlfriend Jordahl, destroyed and she herself sent to a reconditioning camp by the hands of Loki, Lord Thor's advisor. Magni then sought the counsel of Sif, found Mjolnir and confronted his father, Thor. During the confrontation, Asgard was attacked by Desak and Magni was critically injured in the battle. This act showed Thor the error of his ways and set back in time to prevent this future from occurring.
Jake Olson; a paramedic that was bonded with Thor for a time. Olson was slain during a battle between the Avengers including Thor and a Dark Gods controlled Destroyer. Thor is also nearly killed in the battle but is restored by Odin's servant, Marnot after Thor agrees to take Olson's place. Thor carries the dual identities like he did Donald Blake but this time Thor has no memories of Olson's former life. Odin finally separates Olson from Thor after both are injured in another battle with the Destroyer, and allows Olson to return to his own life.
Roger "Red" Norvell; a mortal that was part of a documentary crew brought to Asgard by Loki, meets and falls in love with Lady Sif. Loki gives Norvell Thor's Iron Gauntlets and Belt of Strength to compete with Thor for Sif's affections, with neither realizing this was part of a master plan by Odin to create a surrogate God of Thunder to fulfill a prophecy and die fighting the Serpent of Ragnarok.
Sigyn; goddess of fidelity based on the deity Sigyn, is married to Loki. Sigyn's beauty caught the eye of Loki but she was already engaged to another. Before Sigyn's marriage Loki jealously killed her fiancé and used a spell to take his form during the ceremony. Loki revealed his true identity but Sigyn remained with him due to Asgardian law. After Balder's death, Loki is punished by being chained to rock where a snake constantly drips poison on his face. Sigyn being ever loyal comes to Loki's aid by catching the poison in a bowl. However Sigyn must periodically leave to empty the bowl and during the time she is gone the poison drips in Loki's eye. Loki abandons her for this after he is freed.
Thialfi; based on mythological figure Þjálfi, was one of Thor's advisors during the time known as The Reigning. Thialfi was born during the Viking Age and his parents were killed by Viking marauders. Thor finds Thialfi and convinces Odin to help Thialfi by transforming him into an Asgardian with the condition that Thor one day take Thialfi into his fold. Thialfi is later transported to the future by Zarrko where he becomes one of Thor's advisors. Thialfi soon learns of the dark side of Thor's reign and plots to kill him while he is in the Odinsleep. Thialfi almost does this but is killed by Freki, Odin's pet wolf which is set loose by the Enchantress.
; Puddlegulp is a frog Thor encountered when he himself has been turned into a frog by Loki. Puddlegulp belongs to a community of frogs living in Central Park in New York City, who were engaged in a territorial dispute with the Park's rats. The character befriended Thor, who aided the frog King Glugwart in defeating the rats. Before Thor departs (forcing Loki to undo the spell), Puddlegulp revealed that he was once human, and had been transformed by a Romani. The limited series Lockjaw and the Pet Avengers reveals that Puddlegulp's human name was Simon Walterson (a reference to Walt Simonson, who wrote the original story). Puddlegulp apparently finds a sliver of Thor's hammer Mjolnir and uses it to become Throg, the Frog of Thunder. Throg defends his people against the rats, until contacted by Lockjaw (pet of the Inhumans) to help him locate the Infinity Gems. Throg is briefly shown in the episode "Journey into Mystery" of the Disney+ TV series Loki, where he is trapped in a jar buried underground in the Void at the end of time. His grunt was voiced by Chris Hemsworth, who also portrays the Marvel Cinematic Universe version of the Thor character.
Volla; a wraith, is an advisor to Hela because of her precognitive powers. Volla died after making known her prophecies of ragnarok.
Warriors Three is the name to a group of three Asgardian adventurers that are also among Thor's closest comrades.
Fandral the Dashing is the leader of the group.
Hogun the Grim is the only member of the group who is not an Æsir and whose homeland was destroyed by the Mogul of the Mystic Mountain.
Volstagg the Valiant is the comic relief of the group known for his hearty appetite and wide girth.

William a mortal man with whom the goddess Kelda falls in love.  William travels with the Asgardians to Latvaria but is killed trying to warn Balder about Dr. Doom's plans.
Zeus ruler of the Olympians based on the deity Zeus from Greek mythology is the father of Hercules. Thor highly respects Zeus's wisdom and has on several occasions sought his counsel.

References

Thor characters
Lists of supporting characters in comics
Thor (Marvel Comics)